Klemen Šturm (born 27 June 1994) is a Slovenian professional footballer who plays as a defender for Hapoel Hadera.

Honours
Mura
Slovenian PrvaLiga: 2020–21
Slovenian Cup: 2019–20

References

External links
NZS profile 

1994 births
Living people
Slovenian footballers
Slovenia youth international footballers
Association football fullbacks
NK Triglav Kranj players
NK Krško players
NŠ Mura players
Hapoel Hadera F.C. players
Slovenian PrvaLiga players
Slovenian Second League players
Slovenian expatriate footballers
Expatriate footballers in Israel
Slovenian expatriate sportspeople in Israel